"Trash" is a single by English rock band Roxy Music taken from their 1979 album Manifesto, their first after the comeback that followed the three years hiatus. It peaked at number 40 in the UK charts.
"Trash" was backed by a softened arrangement of the same song, called "Trash 2", which was made available on the box set of The Thrill of It All.

Queercore band Pansy Division recorded a cover of "Trash," which appears on the EP Touch My Joe Camel and the compilation album Pile Up.

Personnel

 Bryan Ferry – vocals, keyboards
 Andy Mackay – oboe, saxophone
 Phil Manzanera – electric guitar
 Gary Tibbs – bass 
 Paul Carrack – keyboards
 Paul Thompson – drums

References

1979 singles
Roxy Music songs
Songs written by Bryan Ferry
Songs written by Phil Manzanera
Island Records singles
Polydor Records singles
1979 songs